Indian Lake High School is a public high school located in Washington Township, Logan County, Ohio, United States, near the village of Lewistown.  It is the only high school in the Indian Lake Local School District.

Athletics
Indian Lake High School is a member of the Central Buckeye Conference, Mad River Division.  The school sponsors 13 varsity sports, including football, soccer, track and field, cross country, golf, bowling, basketball, cheerleading, baseball,  softball, wrestling, and volleyball.

Music
Indian Lake High School offers many performance opportunities, including Chorale, Concert Choir, Meistersingers (Show Choir), Vocal Jazz Ensemble, Marching Band, Symphonic Band, Pep Band, and Jazz Ensemble.

References

External links
 District Website

High schools in Logan County, Ohio
Public high schools in Ohio